The Sukma Games (lit.: Malaysian Games) is a biennial national multi-sport event involving young athletes from Malaysian 13 member states and the Federal territory. The games is regulated by the National Sports Council of Malaysia, the state sports council of the respective member states, the Olympic Council of Malaysia and the National Sports association of the games respective sporting event. The designer of this logo was Mr. Anuar bin Dan in 1986.

Participating teams 

  
  
  
  
  
  
  
  
  
  
  
 
 
 
 

Notes:
  Not from within Malaysia.

Former participating teams 

  
  
  Malaysian Armed Forces (ATM/MAF)
  Malaysian University Sports Council (MASUM)
  Malaysian School Sports Council (MSSM)
  
  Royal Malaysian Police (PDRM/RMP)

Notes:
  Kuala Lumpur, Labuan and Putrajaya participated as a combined Federal Territory contingent since 2006.
  Not from within Malaysia.

Sports
The list below shows the sports that are played at all the Sukma Games since 1986.

Core sports

 Aquatics 
 
 
  
  
  
  
  
  
  
  
 Artistic
 Rhythmic

Optional sports

 
 
  
  
  
  
  
  
  
  
  
  
 
 
  
  
  
  
  
  
  
  
  
  
  
 
  
  
  
 Beach
 Indoor

All-time medal table
Below shows the all time medal table of Sukma Games from 1986 to 2018. Defunct teams are highlighted in italics.

Medal table by edition

1986 Sukma Games

1988 Sukma Games

1990 Sukma Games

1992 Sukma Games

1994 Sukma Games

1996 Sukma Games

1998 Sukma Games

2000 Sukma Games

Edition

List of the Sukma Games' Sportsman and Sportswoman

Para Sukma Games
Para Sukma Games, is a multi-sport event held for Malaysian athletes with disabilities. The games was previously known as the National Games of Malaysia For the Disabled from 1982 until 1998 and the Malaysian Paralympiad from 1998 until 2018 and held separately with Sukma Games until 2010.

Editions

See also
 Sport in Malaysia
 Malaysia at the Olympics
 Malaysia at the Asian Games
 Malaysia at the Commonwealth Games

References

External links
 Sukma Games
 2016 Sukma Games Information Site
 Sukan Malaysia (SUKMA) - Tag Archive - PenyuSukan.com
 1996 Sukma Games official website

 
Multi-sport events in Malaysia
Malaysia
Recurring sporting events established in 1986
Biennial sporting events